= Toplerhaus =

Historic building in Nuremberg, Middle Franconia, Germany

Coordinates: 49°27′29.29″N 11°4′44.47″E

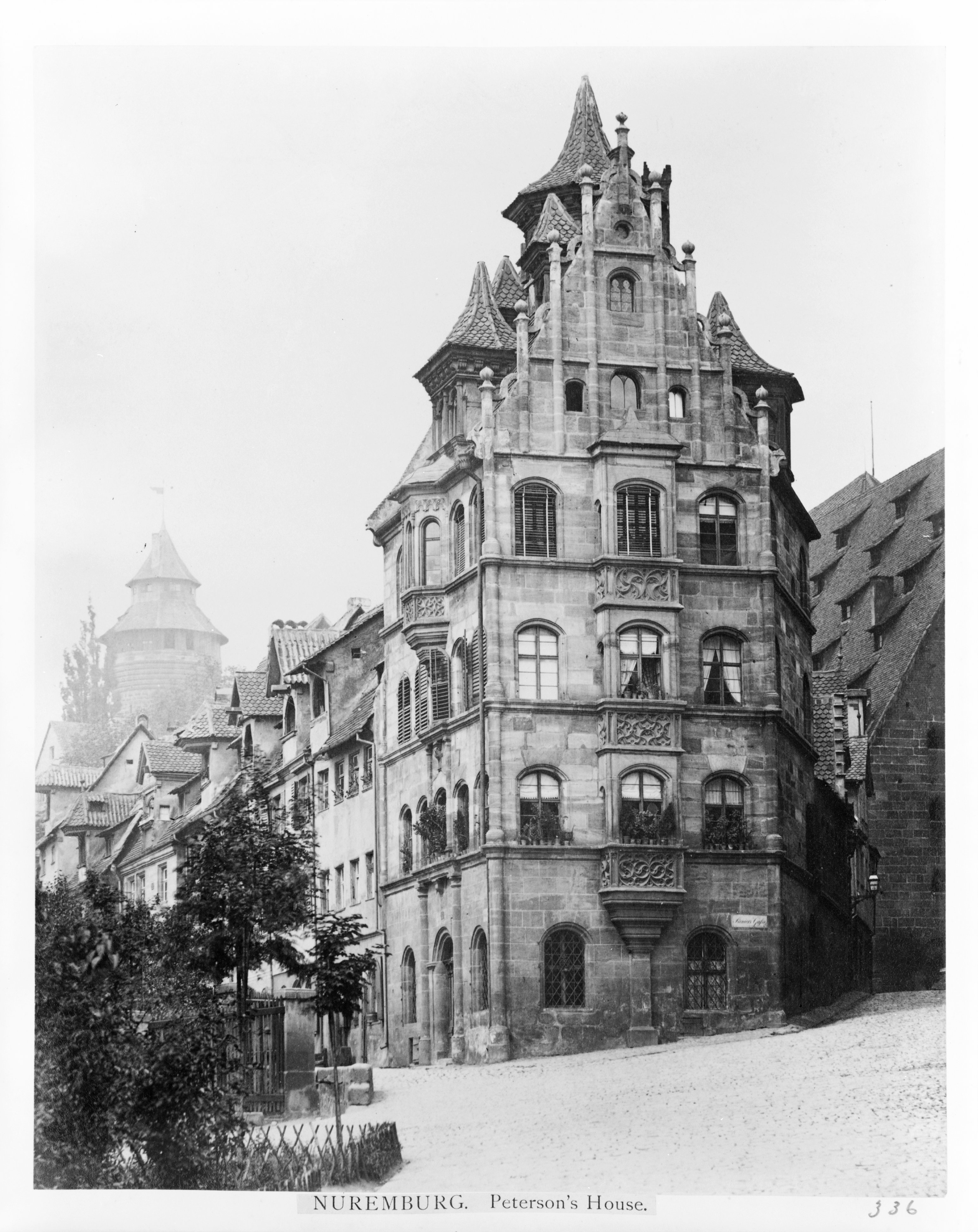
The Toplerhaus, at 17 Untere Söldnersgasse. Photographed between 1860 and 1890.

The Toplerhaus was an important Renaissance town house in the German city of Nuremberg. It was named after the patrician family Topler and was among the most elaborate of the late Renaissance residences in the city. It was destroyed in a bombing raid in World War II.

== Architectural history ==
Jakob Wolff the Elder built the house in 1590/91 as a tower-like sandstone block with a pinnacle. It was a very striking and rather unusual building of the Nuremberg Renaissance style. The facade had rhythmic Gothic patterns overlaid with repeated Gothic 'Chorleins' (oriel or bay windows in Nuremberg) and a multi columned gable. During the air raid on January 2, 1945, the house burned down and collapsed; the remains were removed later. The post-war building that was built in the same place is a simple, purpose-built building with no relevance to building history.

== Location ==
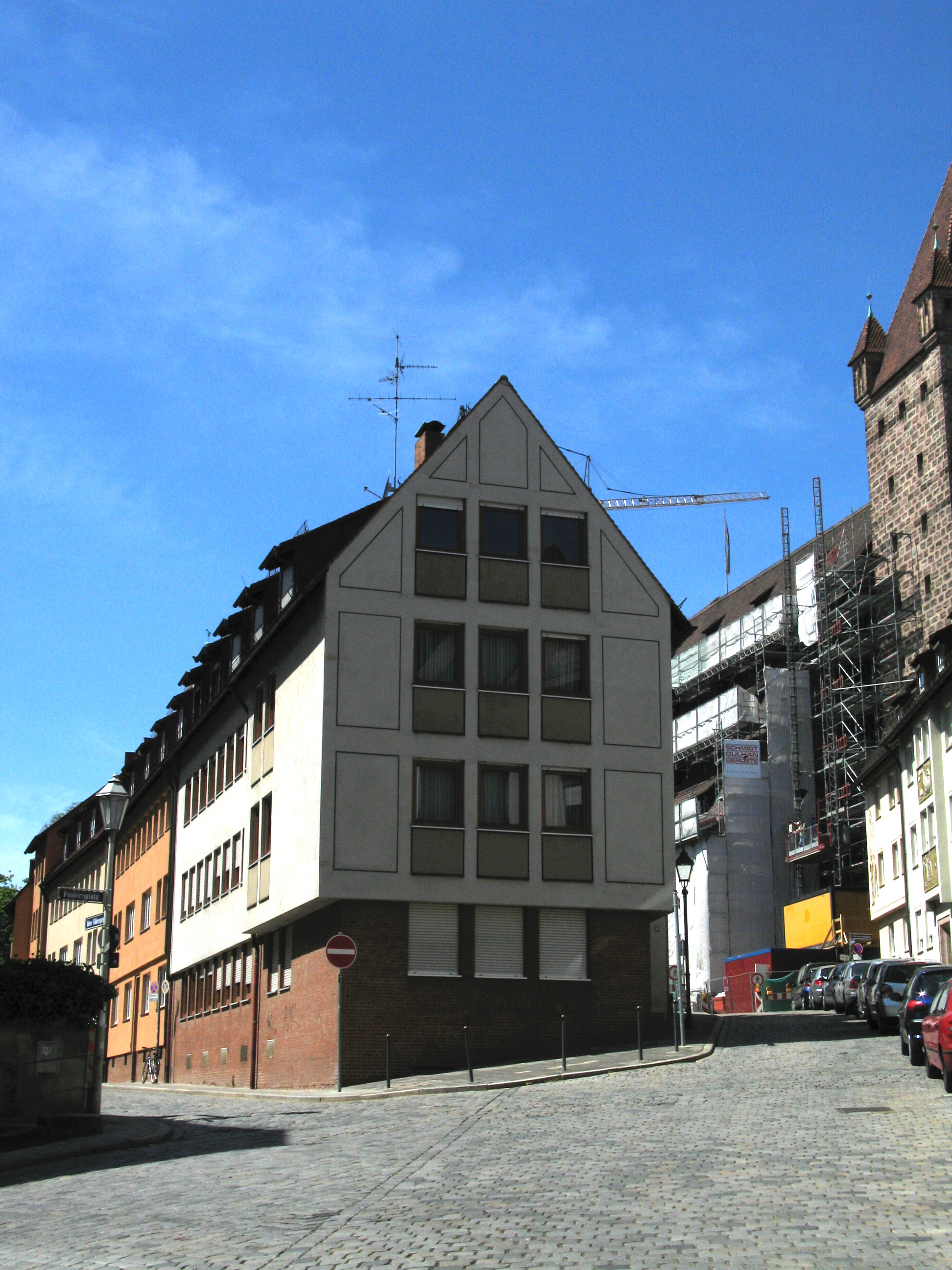
The Post-war building today

The Toplerhaus stood prominently on Paniersplatz in the castle district of Nuremberg's old town. It was flanked by the Upper and Lower Söldnersgasse streets, which lead into the Paniersplatz.

== Literature ==
- Hartwig Beseler, Niels Gutschow: The fate of war in German architecture. Losses, damage, reconstruction. Documentation for the territory of the Federal Republic of Germany. Panorama Verlag, Wiesbaden 2000, ISBN 978-3926642226.
